TATA box-binding protein-associated factor RNA polymerase I subunit A is an enzyme that in humans is encoded by the TAF1A gene.

Function 

Initiation of transcription by RNA polymerase I requires the formation of a complex composed of the TATA-binding protein (TBP) and three TBP-associated factors (TAFs) specific for RNA polymerase I. This complex, known as selective factor 1 (SL1), binds to the core promoter of ribosomal RNA genes to position the polymerase properly and acts as a channel for regulatory signals. This gene encodes the smallest SL1-specific TAF. Two transcripts encoding different isoforms have been identified.

Interactions 

TAF1A has been shown to interact with Acidic leucine-rich nuclear phosphoprotein 32 family member A and Protein SET.

References

Further reading